Letchworth Garden City Eagles Football Club is a football club based in Letchworth, England.

History
Westbury United were formed in 1979, later changing their name to Westbury Eagles and later to Garden City Eagles. During the early 1980s, the club changed their name to Letchworth Garden City Eagles. In 2008, the club joined the Hertfordshire Senior County League Division One, winning the league two years later. Upon promotion to the Premier Division, the club finished as runners-up in 2011, 2015 and 2018, before winning the league in 2019. In 2021, the club was admitted into the Spartan South Midlands League Division One.

Ground
The club currently play at Pixmore Pitches in Letchworth, next to the Hertfordshire FA headquarters.

References

Letchworth
Association football clubs established in 1979
1979 establishments in England
Football clubs in England
Football clubs in Hertfordshire
Hertfordshire Senior County League
Spartan South Midlands Football League